David "Tuffy" Knight (born May 17, 1936) is a former coach of Canadian university football and a member of the Canadian Football Hall of Fame.

Knight was a high school football, track, and basketball coach in Southeastern Ohio who moved to Canada in 1965 to become head coach of the Wilfrid Laurier Golden Hawks in Waterloo, Ontario. He coached the Hawks until 1983. Knight then joined the Toronto Argonauts as director of player personnel, returning to Waterloo in 1988 to coach Laurier's cross-town rivals at the University of Waterloo. At the time, the Waterloo Warriors hadn't won a game since 1985. He missed the entire 1988 season after suffering a mild heart attack, and the Warriors had an 0-7 season in his absence.  Knight came back to be Canadian university football coach of the year in 1989. He coached the Warriors to the Yates Cup provincial title in 1997 and then retired.(3 December 1997). Tuffy Knight leaves UW, Univ. of Waterloo - Press Release  Knight came out of retirement in 2000 to be an assistant coach for the Golden Hawks, working three seasons under head coach Rick Zmich.

Knight won four Yates Cups over his career as head coach (1972, 1973, 1978, 1997). At the time of his retirement, he was the winningest coach in Canadian university football history with 153 career wins (record surpassed in 2003). He was a three-time winner of the Frank Tindall Trophy as the top university football coach in Canada. Knight was inducted into the Canadian Football Hall of Fame in 2007.(20 February 2007). Flutie tapped for hall, Toronto Star

In 2006 he came out of retirement again to coach football at the high school level. He coached the Phoenix of Resurrection Catholic Secondary School (Kitchener, Ontario). Under his coaching, the Phoenix won the following titles:

WCSSAA Division B Champions 2006
WCSSAA Division B Champions 2007
WCSSAA Division A Champions 2008
CWOSSA AAA/AAAA Champions 2008
OFSAA (Western Bowl) Champions 2008

See also
 List of University of Waterloo people

References

1936 births
Living people
Sportspeople from Waterloo, Ontario
Canadian Football League executives
Canadian Football Hall of Fame inductees
Toronto Argonauts personnel
Wilfrid Laurier University
U Sports coaches
Sportspeople from Clarksburg, West Virginia
Wilfrid Laurier Golden Hawks football coaches
Waterloo Warriors football coaches